Ghanashyam Das alias Ghanada, the protagonist of the Ghanada series of science fiction novels written in Bengali, is a fictional character created by Premendra Mitra in 1945. In the novels, the character fights evil and stands against international terrorism. The far-fetched stories take place in multiple international locations, and across a historical timeline. He is depicted regularly outwitting his fellow boarders of the mess-bari at 72, Banamali Naskar Lane, Kolkata (Calcutta). Ghanada was a personification of Premendra Mitra's anti-fascist humanistic ideologies and moral universe. His stories were notably accurate from a historical, geographical and scientific standpoint.

First appearance
Ghanada's first appearance was in a story titled Mosha (The Mosquito), published in the Puja annual Alpana in 1945 published by Deb Sahitya Kutir, Kolkata, West Bengal, India.

Ghanada was engaged by a company in Sakhalin to collect amber sometime during 1939, and in due course, he landed up to a scientific laboratory set by Mr Nishimara, an entomologist, in search of a Chinese labourer who went missing. It was later revealed that Mr. Nishamara was genetically converting the mosquitos into deadly agents of biological warfare. When the lone, genetically engineered mosquito landed on the face of Mr. Nishimara and sealed his fate by stinging him, Ghanada slapped Nishmara to kill the mosquito and eliminated a severe threat towards humanity. He declared he never intended to kill another mosquito ever after in his lifetime.

Characterization

Ghanada
The character of Ghanashyam Das alias Ghanada was outlined as a bachelor, dark-complexioned male with a tall, boney and skeletal structure, aged "anywhere between thirty-five to fifty-five", as described by the author himself in Mosha- the first story of the Ghanada series. He stayed in the third-floor attic of a shared apartment called "Mess-bari" at 72, Banamali Naskar Lane, Calcutta, West Bengal, India, along with other boarders, who called him Ghanada, while Ghana is the shortened form of his name Ghanasyam, and the term "da" is a suffix added to the name of an elder male in Bengal to convey reverence and affection. Though he was rarely found engaged in any activity or work other than telling fantastic tales to the boarders of the apartment, sitting in his armchair and cadging cigarettes from his fellow boarders, his tall tales engaged him with most of the major events that had happened in the world for last two hundred years and there was no place on earth which he didn't visit.

Premendra Mitra, the creator, described Ghanada in an interview by A K Ganguly published in SPAN in 1974, as below:

Reason and medium of arrival at "Mess-bari"
After forty years of publication of the first Ghanada story, the author revealed when and how Ghanada appeared for the first time at 72, Banamali Naskar Lane mess-bari, in the story Ghanada Elen (Ghanada Came) in 1985 at the request of the fans of Ghanada.

"It was the early days of this mess-bari many years ago, when the four friends just occupied this house and were trying to settle down, a strange person, whose age could be anywhere between thirty-five to fifty-five, with a thin and lanky structure like an axe having a deep baritone voice and carrying a small canvas bag, approached them for help.

He needed accommodation to get a confirmed postal address because seven years ago while he was working as an expert in guns, promised Bob Kenneth, a licensed hunter in Uganda, that if his help is needed Bob should put an advertisement in the Times (London) magazine with a symbol of Jerboa.

After watching for the last seven years at last he saw the advertisement in the Times at the Imperial Library of Calcutta while spending a few days in the city. He sent a letter to Bob asking for details in reply to the advertisement letting him know this house at 72 Banamali Naskar Lane as his present address. Now he should wait here only for a few days till the reply comes from Bob.

He himself had chosen a dilapidated rooftop attic room above the second floor and assured that he could manage with the broken bed which he already cleaned up, just for a few days.

The young four friends eagerly agreed to extend all the help to this distressed man, only in lieu of listening from him the interesting story involving Jerboa (no idea what it is), Times Magazine and Bob asked him to stay as long as the reply reaches him. The strange man settled in the attic with his canvas bag. The canvas bag had long gone but the reply from Bob Kenneth never reached in all these years. The man in distress, Ghanada, the fantastic teller of incredible tall tales, settled in the mess-bari rent-free for years to come."

Other characters

The stories are broadly classified into two varieties:

Science-based stories
The Science-based stories were generally told in the common room of 72, Banamali Naskar Lane in front of the charmed boarders who consisted of four permanent young men - Shibu, Shishir, Gaur, and Sudhir, with some other members who appeared occasionally.

The character of Ghanada is believed to be based on Sri Bimal Ghosh, an acquaintance of Premendra Mitra whom he used to call "TenDa". He was a co-boarder during Mitra's stay in a shared apartment house at Gobinda Ghoshal Lane of Bhabanipur in his early years. The other four main characters were also believed to be based on real persons.
Shibu was Shibram Chakraborty, the writer
Shishir was Sisir Mitra, producer and actor in Bengali movies, co-founder of Basumitra Chitra Pratisthan
Gaur was Gauranga Prasad Basu, co-founder of Basumitra Chitra Pratisthan
Sudhir was the author of the stories of Ghanada in the first person, and it was the nickname of Premendra Mitra himself.
Bipin appeared only in Mosha (The Mosquito).
Bapi Datta appeared in Hnas and Suto, and so on.

There were two very important and essential characters, without whom, the Ghanada stories would have been incomplete. They were Banoary, the cook, and Rambhuj, the attendant. Some other staff of the mess-bari was also mentioned in various stories from time to time, such as Uddab, the water provider, and Lachhmania, the cleaner.

History based stories
The history-based stories were told in a completely different environment and the audience was also different. Almost every evening five persons, or at least four out of them, used to gather at a seating arrangement around a tree in Rabindra Sarobar by the side of a lake and discuss various matters ranging from health, imperialism, market rate to Vedanta, philosophy, etc. These five men were -
Ramsharan Babu, whose belly was as big as a round pot
Shibapada Babu, whose head was as smooth as a marble
Harisadhan Babu, whose hair was as white as Saccharum spontaneum
Bhabataran Babu, who was as obese as an elephant
and Ghanashyam Babu (Ghanada), who was as slender and disproportionate as a camel.

Works

Short stories

Novellas

Novels

Others

Published books and compendiums
 1956 - Ghanadar Galpo by Premendra Mitra, Kolkata: Indian Associated Publishing Co. Private Ltd.
 1959 - Adwityo Ghanada  by Premendra Mitra, Kolkata: Indian Associated Publishing Co. Private Ltd.
 1963 - Abar Ghanada by Premendra Mitra, Kolkata: Indian Associated Publishing Co. Private Ltd.
 1964 - Ghanadake Vote Din by Premendra Mitra, Kolkata: Indian Associated Publishing Co. Private Ltd.
 1966 - Ghanada Nityonotun by Premendra Mitra, Kolkata: Indian Associated Publishing Co. Private Ltd.
 1968 - Agra Jakhon Talomawl  by Premendra Mitra, Kolkata: Ananda Publishers Private Limited.
 1969 - Shurjo Knadley Sona by Premendra Mitra, Kolkata: Gronthoprokash.
 1970 - Ghanadar Juri Nei by Premendra Mitra, Kolkata: Shoibya Prakashan Bibhag.
 1971 - Jnar Naam Ghanada by Premendra Mitra, Kolkata: Ananda Publishers Private Limited.
 1973 - Mongolgrohey Ghanada by Premendra Mitra, Kolkata: Shoibya Pustakalay.
 1975 - Ghanashyam-da by Premendra Mitra, Radhakrishna Prakashan.
 1976 - Duniyar Ghanada by Premendra Mitra, Kolkata: Deys Publishing.
 1976 - Aphuronto Ghanada by Premendra Mitra, Kolkata: Saksharata Prakashan / Pashchimbanga Niraksharata Doorikaran Samiti.
 1976 - Ghanashyam-da ke aur kisse by Premendra Mitra, Radhakrishna Prakashan.
 1978 - Ghanadar Phnu by Premendra Mitra, Kolkata: Ananda Publishers Private Limited.
 1979 - Tel Deben Ghanada by Premendra Mitra, Kolkata: Ananda Publishers Private Limited.
 1981 - Ghanada Bichitra by Premendra Mitra, Kolkata: Indian Associated Publishing Company.
 1982 - The Adventures of Ghanada, translated by Lila Majumdar, New Delhi: National Book Trust, India.
 1983 - Ghanadar Hij Bij Bij by Premendra Mitra, Kolkata: Pakshiraj Prakashani.
 1985 - Ghanada O Mou-Ka-Sha-Bi-Sh by Premendra Mitra, Kolkata: Shoibya Prakashan Bibhag.
 1987 - Mandhatar Tope O Ghanada by Premendra Mitra, Kolkata: Ananda Publishers Private Limited.
 1988 - Ghanadar Chingri Brittanto by Premendra Mitra, Kolkata: Ananda Publishers Private Limited.
 1989 - Ghanada O Dui Doshor Mamababu O Parashar by Premendra Mitra, Kolkata: Muktapatra Publications.
 2004 - Mosquito and Other Stories, translated by Amlan Das Gupta, Kolkata: Penguin, India.

Anthologies
 Ghanada Samagra 1
 Ghanada Samagra 2
 Ghanada Samagra 3

Ghanada's World Tour
Ghanada traveled all over the world covering all the continents many times over. There is a Google Travelogue - "Ghanada's World Tour" (Map) showing all the places where Ghanada had traveled along with the routes of such travels, the references of the stories and other relevant information.

Legacy 
During '80s 'Ghanada club' was founded with the participation of Premendra Mitra, Leela Majumdar and others. The club became defunct after a few years. Later, in August 2019, a club with the same name was formed commemorating Ghanada, which has undertaken the archival works pertaining to Ghana Da stories by Mitra involving translation, compilation, audio stories, publication etc.

References

External links

Literary characters introduced in 1945
Characters in written science fiction
Fictional Indian people in literature
Fictional Bengali people
Fiction by featured character
Book series introduced in 1945
Short story series
Short stories set in India
Science fiction short stories
Culture of Kolkata